Alyssopsis is a genus of flowering plants in the family Brassicaceae.

References

Brassicaceae
Brassicaceae genera
Taxa named by Pierre Edmond Boissier